Mohamed Hassan (born 3 October 1993) is an Egyptian professional footballer who plays as a defensive midfielder for Egyptian Premier League club Zamalek.

Honours
Zamalek

Saudi-Egyptian Super Cup: 2018
CAF Confederation Cup : 2018–19
Egypt Cup:  2018–2019
Egyptian Super Cup: 2019–20
 CAF Super Cup: 2020

References

1993 births
Living people
Egyptian footballers
Association football midfielders
Al Ahly SC players
Footballers from Cairo